Gabriel Fernández Álvez (Madrid, 9 July 1943 – Madrid, 2 February 2008) was a Spanish composer. He represented Spain at the I.S.M.E.'s XII Congress and the I.S.C.M.'s XII Congress.

Selected works
 String Quartet No. 1 (1973)
 Hommage to Manuel de Falla (1976)
 Dioramas (1976)
 Concerto for 6 percussionists (1976)
 Hommage to Hindemith
 Lasciate ogni speranza, for soprano, treble, chorus, magnetic tape and orchestra
 Symphony No. 2 (1979)
 Oda for viola and piano (1984)
 Trío Mompou (1984)
 Lyric Phantasy for violin (1985)
 Cántico Matritense (1988)
 Fantasía (desde la lejana cercanía...) for guitar (1990)
 Elegiac Concerto for violin, cello, piano, chorus, 2 trumpets (among the audience), strings and percussion (1990)
 Sonata poética for guitar (1991)
 Gibraltar, opera (1992)
 Liturgia de cristal, 12 Preludes for guitar (1993)
 Concierto Seglar for saxophone and orchestra (1994)
 Violin Concerto (1996)
 La extraña flor de la melancolía, piano sonata (1996)
 Cuadernos para trío
 Concerto for 2 flutes and orchestra
 An-At, trio
 Getsemaní, oratorio (2000)
 Twelve Preludes for piano
 El Profeta, for barytone, chorus and orchestra (2006)
 Fantasía en blanco y negro for piano (2006)
 El poder de la imaginación, for trio (2006)
 Capriccio por trio and ensemble (2007)

External links
Review of his Concerto for six percussionists in El País, 1977
Obituary

1943 births
2008 deaths
Spanish composers
Spanish male composers
20th-century Spanish musicians
20th-century Spanish male musicians